Kalev Spa Water Park is a water park in Tallinn, Estonia. The park consists of 50 m swimming pool which is the biggest in Estonia.

The park was opened in 1965. In 2019 the park was renovated.

In the park there are operating Kalev Swimming School and Orca Swim Club.

References

External links
 Kalev Spa Water Park, at kalevspa.ee

Swimming in Estonia
Buildings and structures in Tallinn
Amusement parks in Estonia
Sports venues in Tallinn